Hampton Hills may refer to:

Hampton Hills, Dallas, Texas
Hampton Hills, New Jersey